Oertel is a surname. Notable people with the surname include:

Brigitte Oertel (born 1953), German fencer
Chuck Oertel (1931–2000), American baseball player
F. O. Oertel (1862–1942), German-born British engineer, architect and archaeologist
Friedrich Meyer-Oertel (born 1936), German opera director
Horst Oertel (1871–1956), Canadian pathologist
Johannes Adam Simon Oertel (1823–1909), German-American Episcopal clergyman and artist
John James Maximilian Oertel (1811-1882), German-American journalist.
Max Joseph Oertel (1835–1897), German physician
Rudi Oertel (born 1926), German diver
Waltraud Oertel (born 1936), German diver